Shanghai Premier League aka SPL is an amateur football (soccer) league based in Pudong, Shanghai, aiming mainly at the expatriate community. Shanghai Premier League was founded in 2003 when 5 existing amateur teams, among which the Shanghai Traffic Police team, who hitherto played only on occasional fixtures, decided to group themselves and play in a double round-robin league format. Simultaneously a Shanghai Premier League Cup is also played. The league's season runs from October to June, with a start tournament to kick off the season and an end tournament to close the season. Occasionally special tournaments and events are held.

Special Events 
 Shanghai Premier League Santa Cup is a one-day 11-a-side tournament occasionally held during winter break.
 Shanghai Premier League World Cup is an event which is held usually at the start of the summer to coincide with the FIFA World Cup. It has been covered by the local media.

Teams

2012/2013 League

Champions and Cup holders

References

External links 
 SPL official website
 Shanghai Lions Football Club
 Etoile Rouge de Shanghai

Football leagues in China